Hoani Matenga is a professional rugby player and musician. He has represented New Zealand in the Maori All Blacks, and has played professionally in France, Japan, Spain and New Zealand. Matenga is also known as a musician, as an early member of the band Six60. He can play electric bass, and in the position of either lock or loose forward.

Born in Christchurch, he attended Christchurch Boys' High School and played for their first XV. In 2009, Matenga graduated from the University of Otago with degrees in marketing and tourism.

Matenga made his starting debut for Otago in their Ranfurly Shield challenge against Canterbury on 12 September 2009. He was a part of the Highlanders' wider training squad for the 2010 Super Rugby season. In 2011 he signed with Stade Montois in France. Looking for a better salary and easier rugby  Matenga signed with the Kubota Spears in the Top League in Japan for the 2012–13 season.

On the 28 October 2015 Matenga was named in the  squad for the 2016 Super Rugby Season.

Matenga was an original member of the New Zealand band, Six60, playing as a Bass guitarist.

Filmography

Film

References

1987 births
People educated at Christchurch Boys' High School
Living people
Otago rugby union players
Wellington rugby union players
University of Otago alumni
New Zealand expatriate rugby union players
New Zealand rugby union players
Expatriate rugby union players in France
Expatriate rugby union players in Japan
Highlanders (rugby union) players
Blues (Super Rugby) players
New Zealand expatriate sportspeople in France
New Zealand expatriate sportspeople in Japan
Kubota Spears Funabashi Tokyo Bay players
Rugby union players from Christchurch
Rugby union locks
Rugby union flankers